Brenna O'Brien (born March 9, 1991) is a Canadian actress and artist. She is best known for voicing Rin in the anime series Inuyasha. Brenna O'Brien was in the original pilot of The Middle in 2007 also starring Ricki Lake and Atticus Shaffer. This pilot was then re-created in 2009 with the current cast.

Career
Brenna began her acting career at age 9, performing in local theatre productions and school plays. Her first film role was in Scooby-Doo 2: Monsters Unleashed at the age of 12 and from there went on to guest star in such films and televisions shows such as Supernatural as the NSA demon secretary Cecily, Stargate SG-1, Meghan in Zixx: Level Two, X-Men: The Last Stand, Phantom Racer and Girl in Progress. She is an accomplished voice over actor, having worked as a guest star as well as lead roles in several anime series, including Inuyasha, Hamtaro, Gundam SEED Destiny, and Elemental Gelade. She was a lead voice in Marvel’s animated feature Next Avengers: Heroes of Tomorrow, Marvel series Iron Man: Armored Adventures and Nintendo’s Dragalia Lost.

Filmography

References

External links

 
 Brenna O'Brien website
 
 The Middle: Meet the original family

1991 births
Living people
Canadian child actresses
Canadian film actresses
Canadian television actresses
Canadian video game actresses
Canadian voice actresses
Canadian people of Irish descent
People from Brampton
Actresses from Ontario
21st-century Canadian actresses